Lu Mountain or Lushan (Gan: Lu-san), officially named Lu Mountain National Park, is a mountain in China. It was also known as Kuanglu in ancient times. It is situated in Jiujiang, China, and is one of the most renowned mountains in the country. Lu Mountain is located primarily in Lushan City within Jiujiang, although its northern portions are found in Jiujiang's Lianxi District. Dahayang Peak is also one of the hundreds of steep peaks that tower above the so-called sea of clouds that can encompass the mountain for almost 200 days each year.

Lu  Mountain is known for its grandeur, steepness, and beauty and is a prominent tourist attraction, especially during the summer months when the weather is cooler in the mountains than elsewhere. The mountain and the surrounding region is also one of the "spiritual centers" of China, containing many Buddhist and Taoist temples, in addition to landmarks of Confucianism. Because of its striking beauty and sacred importance, Lu Mountain National Park has been a UNESCO World Heritage Site since 1996. The overlapping Lu Mountain Geopark is a member of the UNESCO Global Geoparks Network.

History
Lu Mountain contains important sites and temples for Taoism, Buddhism, and Confucianism and even Christianity. Between AD 386 and 402, during the Jin dynasty, Huiyuan founded Pure Land Buddhism and Donglin Temple on the slopes of Lu Mountain. During the Tang dynasty (618–907), Taoist temples were constructed nearby to house sacred scriptures. The White Deer Grotto Academy, founded in AD 940, was developed into a renowned center of academic research during the Song dynasty under the direction of Confucian scholar Zhu Xi. The academy was continually open until at least the 19th century. Other important medieval structures on the mountain include the grave of the famous Tang dynasty poet Tao Yuanming and imperial pavilions during the Ming dynasty.

In later years, Kuling in Lu Mountain became a summer resort for Western missionaries in China. Absalom Sydenstricker, the father of Pearl Buck, was one of the first five missionaries to acquire a property in the Kuling Estate on the mountain. The development of Kuling was instigated by the Reverend Edward Little and Dr. Edgerton H. Hart. The four principal founders of the China's Nurses Association and its first president, Caroline Maddock Hart, met in Kuling to form this association.

During the Long March, in early 1935, a battle took place in this area between communist Red Army and Nationalist forces, in which Hu Yaobang, later General Secretary of the Communist Party of China, was seriously injured.

Lu Mountain was once dubbed the hsiatu (xiadu, "summer capital") of the Republic of China. Chiang Kai-shek, China's leader at the time, would frequently spend his summers here. In June 1937, Zhou Enlai, then a major leader in the Communist Party, met with Chiang on the mountain to discuss a united front against the Japanese invasion. In July 1937, Chiang Kai-shek announced his intention for a full mobilization for war against Japan from Lu Mountain. In 1946, following the war, the U.S. special diplomatic mission led by General George C. Marshall met with Chiang Kai-Shek to discuss the role of post-World War II China.

Mao Zedong convened three large conferences of senior party officials at Lu Mountain, in 1959, 1961, and 1970. The 1959 conference became known as the Lu Mountain Conference. The meeting saw the purge of decorated Chinese Civil War and Korean War general Peng Dehuai, who was critical of Mao's Great Leap Forward policies. The 1970 Lu Mountain Conference took place during the Cultural Revolution, and marked the increasing antagonism between those loyal to Mao and those loyal to his chosen successor, Lin Biao.

In 1980, the famous movie Romance on Lu Mountain, which was entirely shot in Lu Mountain, was released to the public and won considerable positive reception. It was considered as the most progressive film since the founding of communist China, because there was a kissing scene in the movie, which was seen as public taboo in the pre-reform-and-opening-up China. It still holds the Guinness World Record for "the longest first run of a film in one cinema" for having been shown continuously since 1980 until today.

Attractions and features
Popular attractions in Lu mountain include the Immortal Caverns, Meilu Outhouse, Five Old Man Peaks, White Deer Cavern Academy, Three Tiled Springs, Lulin Lake, Lu Mountain Hot Springs, Botanical Garden, the Bamboo Temple, Guanyin Bridge, Peach Blossom Garden, Catholic Church of Lu Mountain, and many more.
 The Lu Mountain Botanical Garden features tens of thousands of plant species.
 Below the Five Old Men Peak is the White Deer Grotto Academy, named after the poet Li Bo (not to be confused with the famous poet Li Bai), who raised white deer there. It is one of the most famous higher learning institutions in ancient China.
 West is the Flower Path which provided inspiration to Bai Juyi, a famous poet who lived during the Tang dynasty.
 Between the Yangtze River and Poyang Lake lie the Greater and Lesser Tianchi Lakes, the Jingxiu Valley, and Lulin Lake. On the north bank of the latter is the Mount Lu Museum, which features pottery and bronzes dating from various periods of ancient China, as well as calligraphy from the Tang dynasty and paintings from the Ming and Qing dynasties.
 At the centre (between three peaks), and at an altitude of over 1 kilometer above sea level, is the town of Kuling, which is linked by a mountain highway to neighboring spots in the region.
 World-famous Lu Mountain Clouds and Mist Tea is grown in the mountains.

Gallery

Climate

References

Lu
Lushan
World Heritage Sites in China
Landforms of Jiangxi
Tourist attractions in Jiangxi
AAAAA-rated tourist attractions